Norman Chihota (born 25 August 1947) is a Tanzanian sprinter. He competed in the 100 metres at the 1968 Summer Olympics and the 1972 Summer Olympics.

References

1947 births
Living people
Athletes (track and field) at the 1968 Summer Olympics
Athletes (track and field) at the 1972 Summer Olympics
Tanzanian male sprinters
Olympic athletes of Tanzania
Athletes (track and field) at the 1966 British Empire and Commonwealth Games
Athletes (track and field) at the 1970 British Commonwealth Games
Athletes (track and field) at the 1974 British Commonwealth Games
Commonwealth Games competitors for Tanzania
Place of birth missing (living people)